Steve Staley, also known as Steve Cannon, is an American voice actor known for providing voices for Japanese anime and video games. Some of his notable roles include Shūhei Hisagi and Tōshirō Hitsugaya in Bleach, Daisuke Aurora in Heat Guy J, Shiro Amada in Mobile Suit Gundam: The 08th MS Team, Moondoggie in Eureka Seven, Kadaj in Final Fantasy VII: Advent Children, Neji Hyuga and Shibuki in Naruto and Eiji Kikumaru  in The Prince of Tennis.

Filmography

Animated series English dubbing

Animation

Film English dubbing

Live action series English dubbing

Video games

Live-action roles

References

External links
 
 
 
 
 Steve Staley and Steve Cannon at Crystal Acids English Voice Actor & Production Staff Database
 

1960s births
Living people
Place of birth missing (living people)
American male video game actors
American male voice actors
20th-century American male actors
21st-century American male actors